DB Class V 200 (also known as Class 220) was the first series production diesel-hydraulic express locomotive of the German Deutsche Bundesbahn and – as Am 4/4 – of the SBB-CFF-FFS in Switzerland.

History

DB Service
Five prototypes of the V 200 were built by Krauss-Maffei in 1953/1954. Full production began in 1956, with 61 engines being built by Krauss-Maffei and 20 by MaK.

These five V 200 prototypes were put through extensive testing, the aim being to ensure the production locomotives would be as reliable as the technology and maintenance standards of the 1950s allowed. In 1955 one locomotive travelled under its own power through Yugoslavia, Greece and Turkey partly as a test and partly to demonstrate the locomotive's capability to potential customers in those countries.

Initially the V 200 hauled express trains on all main lines, replacing the DRG Class 05, DRG Class 03 and DRG Class 01. Following the electrification of many main lines the V 200 was used increasingly for commuter trains and freight trains, but the Hamburg-Westerland, Hamburg-Lübeck-Copenhagen and Munich-Lindau lines still saw the V 200 hauling express trains.

From 1962, the V 200.0 was followed by the more powerful DB Class V 200.1, later Class 221.

From 1977, the V 200.0s were concentrated in northern German engine sheds (Bahnbetriebswerke). These two-engine locomotives were more expensive to operate than single-engine locomotives like DB Class V 160. A further disadvantage was its steam heating system for carriages, since replaced by electric train heating. The last V 200 went out of service with the DB in 1984.

Post-DB service

Saudi Arabia
In 1977 two V 200.0 locomotives were sold to the Heitkamp organisation which had been contracted by the Saudi Arabian Government to carry out repairs and maintenance to a 565 km standard gauge railway line between Dharan and Riyadh. In 1978 a further three V 200s were sold to Heitkamp and shipped to Saudi Arabia. In 1979 the repair and maintenance project, including the locomotives, was taken over by the Greek construction company Archirodon. In 1982 Archirodon bought two further V 200s to break up in order to provide spare parts – particularly engines and transmissions – for the surviving V 200 in Saudi Arabia. These locomotives never went to Saudi Arabia. In Archirodon service most of V 200s were withdrawn due to accidents, the locomotives involved being stripped of parts to keep the remaining locomotives operational. In 1999 at least one damaged locomotive was still extant at Al Hufuf (220 021), along with one complete locomotive (220 046) which was cut up in 2002.

Italy
Between 1982 and 1990, thirteen V 200.0s were sold to various private railway operators in Italy. These were:
Ferrovia Suzzara-Ferrara (FSF) – Three locomotives in 1982;
Cosfer, an infrastructure maintenance contractor, – One locomotive in 1982 and three in 1984;
Ferrovie Padane (FP) – Two locomotives in 1984;
Impresa Veltri, an infrastructure maintenance contractor, – One locomotive in 1984;
IPE Locomotori, a locomotive handler, – One locomotive in 1985 which was scrapped in 1987;
Impresa Valditerra, infrastructure maintenance contractor, – One locomotive in 1986;
Ferrovie Nord Brescia (FNB) – One locomotive in 1990. (then sold to FSF)

In 2000 FSF and FP were merged into a larger company, Ferrovie Emilia-Romagna (FER). In 2003 FER acquired three more V 200.0s from the various track maintenance contractors based in Italy. Between 2001 and 2005, all of the FER V 200.0 locomotives underwent refurbishment in Zagreb which included replacement of the existing Maybach or Mercedes engines with Caterpillar D3508 V8 engines, capable of 810 kW, and modern digital engine control systems in place of the original Brown-Boveri electro-mechanical control system. All the FER locomotives are fitted with the Voith L306r transmission. The locomotives were painted in a rather garish Italian tri-colour (green-white-red) livery.

Greece
After end-of-service with DB in 1988, 20 V200 locomotives were sold to Greece.  During the 1990s, they were then decommissioned one by one and left to rust and rot, until 2002 when all 20 were bought by Prignitzer Eisenbahn GmbH.  A total of 11 were restored to their former glory, and subsequently used for cargo, and in repair and maintenance operations.

Spain
In 1988 one of the Cosfer (Italian) locomotives was transported to Spain to work on the construction of the RENFE AVE lines. This locomotive was still operational in Spain during 2018.

France
In 1985 and 1986 the French infrastructure maintenance company DEHE-Montcocol purchased four V 200.0 for use on construction and maintenance works in France and Belgium. These locomotives were overhauled at the DB works in Nuremberg. In 1987 they were shipped to Algeria to work on a new standard gauge railway construction project. In 1991 the locomotives returned to France to work on new TGV lines. All were scrapped in France between 1997 and 1999.

Switzerland
In October 1986 Seven V 200.0 were sold to the Swiss SBB-CFF-FFS, numbered (SBB Am 4/4 18461–18467). They remained in service until 1997 and the six survivors were sold into private ownership in Germany. These locomotives were refurbished to the standard dictated by SBB-CFF-FFS by Regentalbahn AG of Viechtach, Germany. Refurbishment included additional silencing of the engines. SBB-CFF-FFS stipulated that all locomotives should be fitted with Maybach MD650 engines and Voith L306rb transmissions. In service the locomotives were used to haul trains over electrified railway lines where the electrification was de-energised due to infrastructure works.

Algeria
Regentalbahn AG also refurbished one V 200.0 locomotive for the National Railways of Algeria (SNTF) in 1987. This locomotive was used on track maintenance works along with the four DEHE-Montcocol V 200.0. The loco – formerly 220 048 – was left behind in Algeria by its owners when the track refurbishment work was completed, and has been stored for many years at Constantine depot.

Albania
Regentalbahn AG also were sold five V 200.1 locomotives for the National Railways of Albania (HSH) in 1989, locomotives 221.118, 140, 125, 131, 109. These locos, painted in a nice red, were used with very good results but had to be stored early because the very scarce care of the Albanian railway men.

Germany
It is still possible to see V 200.0 locomotives in Germany. The following locomotives are preserved in museums or operational, generally operating on private charter trains on DB main lines or hauling freight.

The sole surviving prototype V 200 001 is owned by the Franconian Museum Railway in Nuremberg. In 2010 they started the project www.v200-001.de to raise funds and begin restoration.

The DB Museum owned a second prototype V 200 002 until it was destroyed by fire at the museum on 17 October 2005. It also owns V 200 007 which is under the care of the BSW Gruppe at Lübeck. Both locomotives had been active since 1984. V 200 007 is not operational as it is waiting for funds to be made available for new tyres. V 200 007 is not on public display.

V 200 009 is on static indoor display at the Rügen Railway & Technology Museum, Prora, on Rügen Island.

V 200 017 is owned by Classic Train Tours AG of Düsseldorf and is in operational condition. It was fully refurbished and re-engined by WLH Reuschling at Hattingen. It is now fitted with CAT D3508 engines. Additionally the steam heating equipment has been removed and two small diesel generator sets installed, one for train heating and the other to supply auxiliary power to the locomotive. V 200 077 is also owned by CTT and is being refurbished to the same standard.

V 200 018 is on static indoor display at the Deutsches Technikmuseum in Berlin which is housed on the site of former Anhalter Bahnhof depot. On certain days the museum places locomotives outside the roundhouse for better photographic opportunity.

V 200 033 is owned and operated by the Hammer Eisenbahn Museum at Hamm. It operates private charter trains over DB main lines and also over the lines of the WLE from Hamm to Lippborg. It is the only authentic example of a V 200.0 still operational, retaining all the important original features, including Maybach engines, Mekydro transmissions and steam heating equipment.

V 200 053 is owned and operated by Brohltal-Eisenbahn GmbH, where it is numbered "D9". It was refurbished and re-engined by Gmeinder and is now fitted with CAT D3508 engines. This locomotive is primarily a freight engine although it has worked passenger trains in summer months.

220 058 & 220 071 are both on outdoor display at the Technikmuseum Speyer. Neither of these locomotives carry truly authentic liveries nor are they mechanically complete.

V200 013, V200 015 and V200 016 that were previously owned by Swiss Railways are still in existence at Altenbeken and Kornwestheim.

Technology
The V 200 had two fast-running (1500 RPM) V12 diesel engines. The transmission was hydraulic, each engine drove one bogie set via a hydraulic torque converter. The maximum speed was 140 km/h. The prototypes had a maximum power of 1,471 kW, the V 200.0 had a power of 1,618 kW. Unlike some other diesel-hydraulic locomotives the V 200 was renowned for its high reliability. Maybach (type MD650), Mercedes-Benz (type MB820Bb) and MAN (type L 12 V 18/21) engines were used. The hydraulic transmissions fitted to the locomotives were supplied by Maybach (type Mekydro K104U) and Voith (type LT306r/rb). Although differing in several ways – for example the Mekydro K104 transmission had a single torque converter and four mechanical gear stages while the Voith L306 had three different-sized torque converters – the engines and transmissions were designed so that the various types were completely interchangeable, not just amongst V 200.0 but with other locomotive types (V80/V100) and diesel multiple units (VT11, VT08 & VT12) that DB ordered around the same time as the V 200.0. It was not uncommon to find a single locomotive with one Mercedes engine and one Maybach unit running together. The MAN engines were only fitted to five locomotives in 1959 as an experiment and these locomotives eventually had their engines replaced with the more common Maybach or Mercedes engines.

To reduce weight, the locomotives had unusual inside framed bogies. Combined with the high driving position and rounded body, this gave the V 200 a very distinctive appearance.

DR Class V 200
The Deutsche Reichsbahn of the GDR had its own class with the designation V 200, later renamed DR Class 120. These were Soviet Union diesel-electric locomotives, nicknamed Taigatrommel (Taiga and trommel as drum in English i.e. Taiga Drum ), referring to their typical noise and a cynical reference to the Siberian landscape of their Soviet Union's homeland.

After the reunification of Germany these engines were classified by the new Deutsche Bahn as Class 220 as well, since all Western German V 200 units were out of service by that time.

V 200 based developments & exports

British Rail Warship Class 

The British Railways "Warship" class locomotives built in Britain between 1958 and 1962 were based on Krauss-Maffei's V 200.0 design, including the distinctive shape. British Railways licensed the design from Krauss Maffei and various British engineering firms built the different component parts, also under license.

ML2200 (JŽ D66/761)

Based on V 200 series, in 1956 Krauss Maffei built three ML2200 (designated JŽ D66, later 761) series locomotives for Yugoslav Railways. The number of axles was increased from 4 to 6 to cope with the low maximum axle load on Yugoslavian tracks. The locomotives remained in working order until 1991 and are now stored at a railway museum in a suburb of Belgrade.

ML2200/ML3000 – V 300 001/230 001-0

A fourth example of the ML 2200 C'C' was built at Krauss-Maffei's own expense, awaiting a buyer, but the Yugoslavian state railways made no further purchases. In November 1957 Krauss-Maffei commenced a rebuild of the locomotive with more powerful engines and bigger transmissions, in the hope that it would be suitable for the Deutsche Bundesbahn. The designation given to the locomotive by the builder was ML3000 C'C'. Krauss-Maffei had hoped that DB would order more of the ML3000 design to replace steam locomotives in freight service, but instead DB opted for a modest uprating of the original V 200.0 in the form of the V 200.1. Eventually DB bought the locomotive and it worked until being retired in 1975.

ML2700CC (TCDD DH27)

In response to the 1955 visit to Yugoslavia, Greece and Turkey by one of the V200 prototypes, Turkish Railways (TCDD) ordered three Krauss Maffei ML2700 locomotives in 1960. As with the Yugoslavian ML2200 locomotives the Turkish locomotives had six axles, however the external design was completely different from the V200 carbody style with the final product looking more like contemporary US road switcher locomotives with a European twist.  The locomotives worked freight and passenger trains radiating from Ankara until TCDD retired them in 1982.

RENFE Class 340

Thirty Two locomotives of this type were built, ten by Krauss Maffei and exported to Spain, and twenty-two built in Spain by Babcock & Wilcox. Being Iberian gauge vehicles the overall dimensions are larger, and the engines are 16 cylinder versions, giving a total engine power of 4000 hp.

V200.0/220 Class details

References

Further reading

External links

 – V 200 Bestand und Verbleib
 V 200.0 profile Trainspo
 Die Baureihe V 200.0 / V 200.1 Epoche 3
 Museumseisenbahn Hamm
 Class 220 DB-Loks
 T699.org
 V 200 001 at Minden (1980) YouTube
 V 200 033 at Hohenstadt YouTube
 V 200 033 departing Goslar YouTube
 "221 135-7" on a trip between Cologne and Aachen YouTube
 V200 – DB 220 and 221
 DB Class V 200 – Use of a diesel locomotive

V 200
B-B locomotives
Krauss-Maffei locomotives
MaK locomotives
Railway locomotives introduced in 1953
Diesel-hydraulic locomotives of Germany
Standard gauge locomotives of Germany
Standard gauge locomotives of Italy
Standard gauge locomotives of Albania
5 ft 6 in gauge locomotives
Standard gauge locomotives of Saudi Arabia
Standard gauge locomotives of France
Standard gauge locomotives of Switzerland
Standard gauge locomotives of Algeria
B′B′ locomotives
Passenger locomotives
Streamlined diesel locomotives